Batagund Bijbehara is a village in the Anantnag district in the Indian-administered union territory of Jammu and Kashmir. Its post office is at Bijbehara and the nearest medical center is at Veeri. As of 2012, its population was approximately 181 (90 female and 91 male). There is a high school located in this village. It is an ancient village and as according the village contains fabulous past of Hindus. There is also a temple located at the bank of a river "Tarbal". This is a short populated village with mere a total number of 3 dozen households. The neighbouring villages are Laribal, Joibal, Veeri and Gadiseer.

Geography
It is approximately 5,000 meters above sea level.

References

Villages in Anantnag district